The Roman Catholic Diocese of Galloway is an ecclesiastical territory or diocese of the Roman Catholic Church in Scotland. The pre-Reformation Diocese of Galloway, held to have been founded by St Ninian in the fifth century, had broken allegiance with Rome in 1560, and disappeared in 1689 in the (official) Church of Scotland but continued in the Episcopal Church of Scotland. 
The modern Roman Catholic diocese incorporates the local authority areas of Dumfries and Galloway, South Ayrshire, East Ayrshire and parts of North Ayrshire, (Cumbrae). The bishop's cathedra is at St Margaret's Cathedral, Ayr.

The diocese was re-established by the Roman Catholic Church on 4 March 1878, with its cathedral in Dumfries and its territory covering the sparse and rural counties of Dumfriesshire, Kirkcudbrightshire, Wigtownshire and parts of Ayrshire.  Following the reorganisation of the Archdiocese of Glasgow in 1947, parishes to the north of Galloway were transferred to it from Glasgow, creating a significant population centre for the first time around the town of Ayr. In response to this development Bishop McGee moved his residence from Dumfries to Ayr and, following a catastrophic fire at St Andrew's Cathedral in May 1962, it was decided that the Good Shepherd Church, Ayr should also become the diocesan cathedral. The third and present cathedral, following the closure of Good Shepherd Cathedral in May 2007, is St Margaret's Cathedral in Ayr.

The eighth and most recent bishop of the diocese was the Right Reverend William Nolan, since 2022 the Archbishop of Glasgow.

Bishops

Past and present ordinaries

(The following list is included in, but is not the only part of, post-Reformation bishops in the above-mentioned main article.)
The following is a list of the modern Bishops of Galloway:

 John McLachlan (appointed 22 March 1878 – died 16 January 1893)
 William Turner (appointed 16 June 1893 – died 19 January 1914)
 James William McCarthy (appointed 25 May 1914 – died 24 December 1943)
 William Henry Mellon (succeeded 24 December 1943 – died 2 February 1952)
 Joseph Michael McGee (appointed 19 July 1952 – retired 4 April 1981)
 Maurice Taylor (appointed 4 April 1981 – retired 7 April 2004)
 John Cunningham (appointed 7 April 2004 – retired 22 November 2014)
 William Nolan  (appointed 22 November 2014 – installed as Archbishop of Glasgow 26 February 2022)

The diocese is presently sede vacante.

Coadjutor Bishop
William Henry Mellon (1935-1943)

Parishes

The following is a list of current and former churches within the Diocese of Galloway:

 Ayr, St Margaret's Cathedral
 Ayr, St Paul's, Belmont
 Ayr, Good Shepherd Cathedral, Whitletts (church closed)
 Annan, Saint Columba
 Ardrossan, Saint Peter-in-Chains 
 Auchinleck, Our Lady & St Patrick
Beith, Our Lady of Perpetual Succour
 Castle Douglas, Saint John the Evangelist (church closed)
 Catrine, Saint Joseph (church closed)
 Cumnock, Saint John the Evangelist
 Dalbeattie, Saint Peter 
 Dalry, Saint Palladius
 Darvel, Our Lady of the Valley (church closed) 
 Drongan, Saint Clare (church closed) 
 Dumfries, Saint Andrew 
 Dumfries, Saint Teresa
 Galston, Saint Sophia 
 Gatehouse of Fleet, Church of the Resurrection (closed February 2020)
 Girvan, The Sacred Hearts of Jesus and Mary
 Hurlford, Saint Paul
 Irvine, Saint John Ogilvie
 Irvine, Saint Margaret of Scotland (Closed)
 Irvine, Saint Mary
 Kilbirnie, Saint Brigid
 Kilmarnock, Saint Joseph
 Kilmarnock, Saint Matthew
 Kilmarnock, Saint Michael (church closed 2017 and demolished )
 Kilmarnock, Our Lady of Mount Carmel
 Kilwinning, Saint Winin
 Kirkconnel, Saint Conal (church closed)
 Kirkcudbright, Saint Andrew and Saint Cuthbert
 Langholm, Saint Francis of Assisi (church closed)
 Largs, Saint Mary, Star of the Sea
 Lockerbie, Holy Trinity
 Maybole, Our Lady and St Cuthbert
 Millport,  Isle of Cumbrae, Our Lady of Perpetual Succour
 Moffat, Saint Luke
 Mossblown, Saint Ann
 Muirkirk, Saint Thomas, Apostle
 New Abbey, Saint Mary 
 Newton Stewart, Our Lady and Saint Ninian
 Prestwick, Saint Quivox
 Saltcoats, Saint Brendan (closed)
 Saltcoats, Our Lady, Star of the Sea
 Stevenston, Saint John
 Stewarton, Our Lady and Saint John (closed 2019) 
 Stranraer, Saint Joseph
 Troon, Our Lady of the Assumption and Saint Meddan 
 Waterside, Saint Francis Xavier
 West Kilbride, Saint Bride
 Whithorn, Saint Martin and Saint Ninian 
 Wigtown, The Sacred Heart (no Sunday Mass)

See also
 Catholic Church in Scotland

References

External links
Diocese of Galloway
GCatholic.org
Catholic Hierarchy

http://www.gallowaydiocese.org.uk/parishes/4590439073
https://scotlandschurchestrust.org.uk/church/st-peter-in-chains-ardrossan/
https://canmore.org.uk/site/156743/troon-st-meddans-street-church-of-our-lady-of-the-assumption-and-st-meddan
https://canmore.org.uk/site/256587/new-abbey-st-marys-roman-catholic-church-presbytery
http://www.scottisharchitects.org.uk/building_full.php?id=406695
https://canmore.org.uk/site/159934/dumfries-shakespeare-street-st-andrews-rc-pro-cathedral
https://canmore.org.uk/site/120851/dalbeattie-craignair-street-saint-peters-roman-catholic-church
https://canmore.org.uk/site/181213/galston-bentinck-street-st-sophias-roman-catholic-church
http://www.sconews.co.uk/news/57622/very-sad-day-as-stewarton-church-closes-after-45-years/

Religion in Ayr
Roman Catholic dioceses in Scotland
Religious organizations established in 1878
Roman Catholic dioceses and prelatures established in the 19th century
1878 establishments in Scotland
Galloway
Organisations based in South Ayrshire
Dumfries and Galloway
South Ayrshire
East Ayrshire
North Ayrshire
Roman Catholic Ecclesiastical Province of St Andrews and Edinburgh